Hans-Ulrich Klose (born 14 June 1937) is a German politician from the Social Democratic Party and a former member of the German Federal parliament (German: Bundestag). Klose was the First Mayor (German: Erster Bürgermeister) of the Free and Hanseatic City of Hamburg from 1974 up to 1981, serving as President of the Bundesrat in 1979/80.

Early life
Klose was born in Breslau (now better known under its Polish name Wrocław), Province of Lower Silesia. After the end of World War II, Klose's family fled from Breslau and moved to Bielefeld. In 1957 he received his high-school diploma and started studying law at the universities of Freiburg and Hamburg. In 1961 he passed the First, in 1965 the Second Legal State Examination, and started working as a lawyer in Hamburg.

Political career

Career in state politics
After joining the Social Democratic Party of Germany (SPD) in 1964, Klose became a member of the Hamburg Parliament (Hamburgische Bürgerschaft) in 1970, where he was vice chairman of his faction. Two years later he became first chairman of the SPD parliamentary group. In October 1973, Klose succeeded Heinz Ruhnau as minister of the interior of Hamburg.

Only a year later, on 12 November 1974, Klose became First Mayor (Erster Bürgermeister) of the Free and Hanseatic City of Hamburg at the age of 37. At the time, he was widely regarded as a leading figure in the left wing of the party. After a party internal argument about the construction of the Brokdorf Nuclear Power Plant, he resigned from his office on 25 May 1981.

Member of the German Parliament, 1983–2013
In the 1983 elections, Klose was elected as a member of the German Parliament, the Bundestag, for the SPD. In this position, he succeeded Herbert Wehner. From 1987 to 1991 he was treasurer of his party (German: Bundesschatzmeister), serving as part of the party’s national leadership under chairman Hans-Jochen Vogel.

From 1991 to 1994 Klose served as chairman of the SPD group in the Bundestag, and in this position also leader of the opposition; at the time, he was chosen over two better-known candidates. In his role as opposition leader, he worked with his CDU/CSU counterpart Wolfgang Schäuble on establishing a majority for a landmark 1993 constitutional amendment on tightening the Germany’s asylum law, barring entry to thousands of foreigners who arrive in the country each week to seek asylum.

Ahead of the 1994 elections, SPD chairman Rudolf Scharping included Klose in his shadow cabinet for the party’s campaign to unseat incumbent Helmut Kohl as Chancellor. During the campaign, he served as shadow minister of defence. Following the party's defeat in the elections, Klose resigned from the group's leadership to make room for Scharping. Instead he was elected one of the vice presidents of the German Bundestag the same year.

In 1998 Klose became chairman of the Committee on Foreign Affairs. From 2002, he served as its vice president, alongside chairman Ruprecht Polenz. From January 2003 Klose also chaired the German-American Parliamentary Friendship Group. Within his parliamentary group, he served on its task force on Afghanistan and Pakistan between 2009 and 2013.

On 16 March 2010, Germany's Minister for Foreign Affairs Guido Westerwelle appointed Klose to succeed Karsten Voigt as the government's coordinator for German-American affairs, a rare case of a senior political appointment not being given to a member of the governing party . He resigned from that position in 2011.

After leaving politics, Klose took up a position as senior advisor to the Robert Bosch Foundation.

Other activities
 CARE Deutschland-Luxemburg, Member of the Board of Trustees
 Friedrich Ebert Foundation (FES), Member
 Green Helmets, Member of the Board of Trustees
 Otto von Bismarck Foundation, Member of the Board of Trustees
 Progressives Zentrum, Member of the Circle of Friends

Recognition
In March 2013 the Congressional Study Group on Germany presented Klose with the inaugural International Statesmanship Award in appreciation "for his longstanding service to strengthening the US-German relationship".

Personal life
Since 1992 Hans-Ulrich Klose has been married to his third wife, a physician. He has two daughters and two sons from his first two marriages.

Notes

References
 Biography

External links

 
 Official site 
 German Parliament site 
 Personal data sheet

1937 births
Living people
Mayors of Hamburg
Presidents of the German Bundesrat
Members of the Bundestag for Hamburg
People from the Province of Lower Silesia
Politicians from Wrocław
German cooperative organizers
University of Freiburg alumni
University of Hamburg alumni
Members of the Bundestag 2009–2013
Members of the Bundestag 2005–2009
Members of the Bundestag 2002–2005
Members of the Bundestag 1998–2002
Members of the Bundestag 1994–1998
Members of the Bundestag 1990–1994
Members of the Bundestag for the Social Democratic Party of Germany